Choong-Seock Chang is a South Korean physicist.

Chang earned an undergraduate degree from Seoul National University in 1974, and pursued a doctorate at the University of Texas at Austin. After completing his studies in 1979, Chang undertook research in La Jolla and Carlsbad, California. In 1986, Chang was appointed a professor of physics at the Korea Advanced Institute of Science and Technology, and concurrently held a research professorship at New York University's Courant Institute of Mathematical Sciences from 1988. He became a research physicist at Princeton Plasma Physics Laboratory in 2011, and retained a joint professorship at KAIST. While at New York University, Chang was elected to fellowship of the American Physical Society in 2006, "[f]or seminal and pioneering contributions in neoclassical, rf-driven, and basic transport theories, and for his leadership in plasma edge simulation in torodial magnetic confinement devices."

References

Living people
Year of birth missing (living people)
South Korean physicists
South Korean expatriates in the United States
Seoul National University alumni
University of Texas at Austin alumni
Princeton University faculty
New York University faculty
Fellows of the American Physical Society
Academic staff of KAIST